Moriagaro (stylized as MORIAGARO) ("Let's Get Down")  is the tenth studio album by Japanese-American singer-songwriter Ai, released on July 17, 2013 by EMI Records Japan and Universal Music Group. The album marked her first and only release under EMI Records Japan following Universal's purchase of EMI's music operations prior to its rebranding as EMI Records in 2014. Musically, Moriagaro expands on the dance-pop sound found on Ai's previous studio album, Independent, with R&B and hip hop sensibilities. Alongside long-time collaborator Uta, Ai worked with various American producers. On November 20, 2013, the album was reissued as Motto Moriagaro.

Writing and production 

The album was written by Ai, collaborating with American and Japanese producers. Ai collaborated with four singers: American R&B singers Jeremih, Lloyd and Bridget Kelly, as well as Malaysian Australian R&B singer Che'Nelle, who has based her career in Japan since 2011. Five of the songs are sung in Japanese, and three entirely in English. "Moriagaro," "Don't Turn Me Off" and "Gotta Get Mine" are sung in a mix of English and Japanese.

Album recording took place mostly in Tokyo, as well as in West Hollywood, Atlanta and New York City.

Ai worked mostly with Japanese producer Uta (who she has worked with since Viva Ai (2009)) on the songs "Hanabi," "My Place," "Sogood" and "Voice." This is the first time that Ai only worked with a single Japanese producer on an album. Ai worked with five American producers on the remaining songs. Fifty 1 Fifty produced three songs, "For You," "Top of the World" and "After the Storm." De-Capo Music Group worked on "Moriagaro," C3prod on "Dear Mama" and Wonda Music on "Gotta Get Mine." Ai worked together with producer D.Clax and The Exclusives on the song "My Baby."

Promotion and release 

The first single released from the album was "Voice" in February 2013. The song was used as the theme song for the drama Yakō Kanransha, starring Kyōka Suzuki and Yuriko Ishida. The single became a big hit, being certified by the RIAJ as a gold single a month after release. It is currently her fourth most sold physical single since her debut. It is also her last release under the then-independent EMI Music Japan.

Ai followed up the single with two digital singles. The first was "Mama e," used in a Lotte chocolate commercial campaign for Mother's Day, and "After the Storm," used as the theme for the Japanese release of the Hong Kong martial arts film The Grandmaster. Three other songs were used for TV commercials. "Sogood" was used for KFC Japan commercials, "For You" for Kubota commercials, and "My Place" for Japan Rail in promotion of the Kyushu Shinkansen. "Gotta Get Mine" was also used as the July opening theme for the TV Tokyo R&B/dance program Chōryūha. "Top of the World" was later used as the opening theme for the TBS drama Higanjima in October 2013.

Music videos were produced for the album songs "Gotta Get Mine," "Hanabi," "My Place," and "Sogood."

Tours 

Ai's Moriagaro Tour began in October in Kanagawa, Japan, and included 33 dates. The final concert was held on December 18, 2013, at the Nippon Budokan in Tokyo.

Track listing 

Credits adapted from the liner notes of Moriagaro and Tidal.Notes

 Tracks 1, 3–4, 8, and 10–12 are stylized in all capitals.
 Track 6 is titled in Japanese
 Track 7 is stylized in all lower case.

Charts

Sales and certifications

Personnel

Personnel details were sourced from Moriagaros liner notes booklet.ManagerialYuki Arai – executive producer
Takeshi Fukushima – advance marketing chief
Shigetaka Haratake – sales promotion
Hiroyuki Jinno – legal rights and business affairs
Nozomu Kaji – marketing, promotion
Junji Kaseya – associate producer
Kimiko Kato – sales promotion
Saikan Kobayashi – project assistant
Kazuhiro Koike – executive producer

Toshiharu Kojima – artist management
Jiro Koyasu – associate producer
Kyosuke Ochiai – design coordination
Shinobu Ozawa – artist management
Koichi Sakakibara – artist manager
Satomi Takizawa – artist management
Seiichi Watanabe – A&R
Yusuke Yamamoto – project assistantPerformance creditsAi – vocals, background vocals
Che'nelle – vocals (#9)
Jeremih – vocals (#1)

Bridget Kelly – vocals (#8)
Lloyd – vocals (#5)
Swiss Chris – drums (#8)Visuals and imageryAmbush – costume cooperation
Justin Davis – costume cooperation
Noriko Goto – stylist
Ayako Hishinuma – prop creator ('Moriagaro Bling Bling')
Manabu Honchu – design
Justin & Valley – logo design
Akio Kawabata – package coordination
Yasunari Kikuma – photographer

Akemi Ono – hair, make-up
Toshiya Ono – art direction
Shuma Saito – package coordination
Silver Face – prop creator ('Moriagaro Knuckle Rings')
Shigeaki Watanabe – prop creator ('Moriagaro Cap')
Wut Berlin – costume cooperation
X-Closet – costume cooperation
Eiji Yoshimura – designTechnical and production'

Ai – producer (#1, #3-4, #6-7, #9-10)
Arden 'Keys' Altino – co-producer (#8)
Ben-E – producer (#6)
Jo Blaq – mixing, vocal recording (#12)
C3prod – producer (#6)
Tom Coyne – album mastering
D.Clax – producer (#5)
De-Capo Music Group – producer (#1)
DOI – mixing (#1-7, #9-11)
Akene 'The Champ' Dunkley – co-producer (#8)
Jerry 'Wonda' Duplessis – producer (#8)
Fifty 1 Fifty – producer (#9-10, #12)
Keisuke Fujimaki – vocal recording (#4)
Seiji Itabashi – assisting (#8, #11)
Carlos 'Los' Jenkins – vocal recording (#12)

Neeraj Khajanchi – additional vocal recording (#8), vocal recording (#11)
T. Kura – vocal editing (#2)
Sean 'Pen' McMillion – engineering (#5), vocal producer for Lloyd (#5)
Michico – vocal producer (#2)
Yoshinori Morita – vocal recording (#1, #6-7, #9)
Taiji Okuda – Japanese production (#5), recording (#2-3, #10)
Mario Parra – Che'nelle's vocal recording (#9)
Lance Powell – assisting (#8)
Andrew Robertson – assisting (#8)
Mark Roger – vocal recording (#1)
Serge 'Sergical' Tsai – recording (#8)
Uta – producer (#2-4, #7, #11)
Satoshi Yoneda – vocal editing (#2)

Release history

References 

2013 albums
Ai (singer) albums
Japanese-language albums
EMI Records albums
Universal Music Group albums
Universal Music Japan albums
Albums produced by Ai (singer)